Richard S. H. Mah (16 December 1934 – 30 May 2004) was a Chinese-born chemical engineer and professor at Northwestern University in the United States.

Early life and education
Mah was born in Shanghai on 16 December 1934, to parents S. Fabian Soh Pai and E. Shang (Chang). Mah's parents sent him to England in 1950. Mah completed a bachelor's of science in chemical engineering from the University of Birmingham, and received his Ph.D. in 1961 from the Imperial College London under the guidance of Roger W. H. Sargent on process systems engineering. Mah became the first Ph.D. graduate from the Sargent research group. Mah moved to the University of Minnesota in 1961 for his postdoctoral work. Mah married Stella Lee in 1962.

Career 
Mah worked for Union Carbide between 1963 and 1967, then Esso. He joined the faculty of Northwestern University in 1972 as an associate professor, and retired in 1994 as a professor. Mah was a fellow of the American Institute of Chemical Engineers, and received its Computing in Chemical Engineering Award, Ernest Thiele Award, and other divisional awards. He was also awarded the American Society for Quality Jack Youden Prize.

Books
 2 volumes

Death and legacy
Mah died on 30 May 2004 due to a heart attack at the age of 69 in Glenview, Illinois. From 2005, the Department of Chemical and Biological Engineering at Northwestern University held an annual Mah Memorial Lecture in his honor.

References 

Chemical engineering academics
Chinese chemical engineers
20th-century Chinese engineers
Chinese expatriates in the United Kingdom
Engineers from Illinois
Fellows of the American Institute of Chemical Engineers
Chinese emigrants to the United States
1934 births
20th-century American engineers
Alumni of the University of Birmingham
Engineers from Shanghai
Alumni of Imperial College London
American chemical engineers
2004 deaths